Umberto Bossi (born 19 September 1941) is an Italian politician and former leader of Lega Nord (Northern League), a party seeking autonomy or independence for Northern Italy or Padania. He is married to the Sicilian Manuela Marrone, and has four sons, of whom one was from his first wife.

Birth and education
Bossi was born in 1941 in Cassano Magnago, in the province of Varese, Lombardy. He graduated from scientific high school (liceo scientifico) and later began studying medicine at the University of Pavia, though he did not get a degree. In 1975 he was a member of the Italian Communist Party for a brief period. In February 1979 he met Bruno Salvadori, leader of the Valdostan Union.

Politics

After the death of Salvadori in a car accident during the summer of 1980, Bossi began focusing more on Lombardy. After two years, the autonomist Lombard League was born. In that period Bossi met his second wife, Manuela Marrone.

The Lega Lombarda would later seek alliances with similar movements in Veneto and Piedmont, forming the Northern League, of which he was the federal secretary until 5 April 2012. He became the undisputed and unchallenged leader of the party, a position that he maintained until 2012, even after a serious stroke. He is currently the League's federal president, an honorary title devoid of real power, and is trying to regain the leadership of the movement he founded.

When the scandals of Tangentopoli were unveiled from 1992 on, Bossi rode the wave, presenting himself as the new man in politics, and set out to sweep away corruption and incompetence. Bossi himself received an eight-month suspended prison sentence, along with Northern League's treasurer at the time of the events Alessandro Patelli, for receiving a 200-million-lire bribe in a trial that also convicted many of the politicians he routinely attacked, such as Bettino Craxi, Arnaldo Forlani and others. Bossi's sentence was upheld on appeal.

In 1998, Bossi received a one-year suspended prison sentence for incitement of violence after he uttered the following sentence at a Lega Nord meeting: "We must hunt down these rascals [neo-fascists], and if they take votes from us, then let's comb the area house by house, because we kicked the fascists out of here once before after the war."

While being Reforms minister in 2003 Bossi ordered the Navy to fire live rounds on boats holding illegal immigrants, stating: "After the second or third warning, bang… we fire the cannon."

Bossi was critical of the European Union, and once described it as a "nest of communist bankers".

Institutional experience

Bossi began his institutional career in 1987 as the only senator of the Northern League, of which he was the leader. He was then given the nickname Senatur (pron. [sena'tu:r]), senator in Lombard, which stuck even when he was later elected as an MP in the Italian Chamber of Deputies.

He was instrumental in the unexpected victory of Silvio Berlusconi's coalition in 1994, but he broke the alliance after just a few months, with the first Berlusconi cabinet collapsing before Christmas 1994.

Bossi agreed to return to an alliance with Berlusconi, which ultimately led to the (this time, easily predicted) 2001 electoral victory.

He then served in Silvio Berlusconi's second cabinet as Reforms Minister. However, after suffering a stroke on 11 March 2004, which seriously impaired his speech, he quit on 19 July 2004 to take up a seat as a member of the European Parliament, where he registered an attendance to 9 per cent of the plenary sessions in his last mandate. Bossi later slowly returned to active politics.

Return to political activity

On 11 January 2005, Bossi appeared on the political scene at the last house of the Lombard federalist politician Carlo Cattaneo at Lugano after 306 days from the accident. During that day, he met the Minister of Economy Giulio Tremonti (Forza Italia) with whom he constituted the political agreement called the "Alliance of the North" (Asse del Nord). He also met a representative of the Lega dei Ticinesi, a Swiss localist Movement led by the Luganese entrepreneur Giuliano Bignasca. During his speech Bossi spoke against the "Europe of Masons".

During the national elections of 2006 he signed a political agreement with the Movement for Autonomy, led by the Sicilian politician Raffaele Lombardo.

On 17 September 2006, he returned in Venice for the tenth anniversary of the Declaration of Independence of Padania. He declared that the Parliament of the North must be opened again.

On 2 February 2007, in Vicenza, he officially opened the first monthly meeting of the Parliament of the North.
Umberto Bossi and Lega Nord have now abandoned the idea of independence for Padania, proposed in 1996.

In September 2007, Bossi accepted an invitation by Father Florian Abrahamowicz to his celebration of a Tridentine Mass and said there were affinities between the Lega Nord and the followers of Archbishop Marcel Lefebvre. Father Abrahamowicz is seen as unofficial chaplain of the party.

Fourth Berlusconi cabinet

On 8 May 2008, he became Minister for Institutional Reforms again, in Silvio Berlusconi's fourth cabinet. He held the position until 16 November 2011.

Resignation as leader of Northern League
On 5 April 2012, when news broke of an alleged appropriation of party funds for the private affairs of his family, Umberto Bossi resigned as federal secretary of Northern League. Italian prosecutors have alleged that Bossi used the money earmarked for his party on his house renovations and on favours for his family. Following the resignation, the Lega Nord instantly gave him the honorary position of party President. Leadership of the Northern League was initially entrusted to a so-called "triumvirate" composed by Roberto Maroni, Roberto Calderoli and Manuela Dal Lago. On 7 December 2013 Matteo Salvini took over as official leader of the party.

With a decision of August 2019, the Supreme Court of Cassation decreed, as reported by Reuters, that "the case against former League leader Umberto Bossi and its former party treasurer had expired due to the statute of limitations, but the confiscation of the funds remained in place." The ruling was published on 5 November 2019 after a Court of Appeals ruling of 26 November 2018 and initial ruling of 24 July 2017, related to the party's financial statements of 2009 and 2010.

Electoral history

First-past-the-post elections

See also

 Padania
 Lega Nord

References

External links
 Official biography from the Web site of Lega Nord. 
 The League, Bossi and what comes after, biography of Bossi and storyline of the League by the conservative magazine Ideazione. 
 Padanian poker's last hand, biography by the left-wing newspaper L'Unità. 

1941 births
Living people
People from the Province of Varese
Government ministers of Italy
Lega Nord politicians
Members of the Chamber of Deputies (Italy)
Members of the Senate of the Republic (Italy)
Politicians of Lombardy
Italian politicians convicted of crimes
Lega Nord MEPs
MEPs for Italy 2004–2009
20th-century Italian politicians
21st-century Italian politicians
Candidates for President of Italy